The 2011 ITF Women's Circuit was the 2011 edition of the second tier tour for women's professional tennis. It is organised by the International Tennis Federation and is a tier below the WTA Tour. During the months of October to December 2011 over 100 tournaments were played.

Key

October

November

December

See also 
 2011 ITF Women's Circuit
 2011 ITF Women's Circuit (January–March)
 2011 ITF Women's Circuit (April–June)
 2011 ITF Women's Circuit (July–September)
 2011 WTA Tour

 10-12